Markelda Montenegro de Herrera (born 1957) is a Panamanian social scientist working on human rights and gender inequality, and has served as Minister for Women.

Early life and education
She was born on 30 January 1957 in San Lorenzo, Chiriquí Province, Panama. She has a degree in law and political science (1987) and a master's degree in education (2013), both from the University of Panama.

Career
Montenegro's research has focused on human rights and gender inequality, including projects such as "Keys to success for quality education, gender inequality in access to elected office" and "Factors involved in femicide in Panama, in indigenous women Ngäbe- Bugle and Afro-descendants ". She has taught at the University of Panama on topics involving law, gender and human rights, and has worked in other areas such as the country's community library program, the promotion of citizen participation, and gender training. She was a member of the commission which redrafted Panama's criminal code to recognise femicide.

Montenegro was the first director general of the Panamanian Instituto Nacional de la Mujer (National Institute for Women), elected in 2009.

She is the CEO of Centro de Investigaciones Científicas de Ciencias Sociales (CENICS).

She was elected a vice-president of the Inter-American Commission of Women (CIM) for 2013–2015.

In 2014 the Central American Parliament (PARLACEN) declared her to be an "Outstanding Woman" in recognition of her work for the women's rights in the region.

Selected publications

References

External links

ORCID record

1957 births
Living people
Women government ministers of Panama
Government ministers of Panama
University of Panama alumni
Panamanian social scientists
21st-century Panamanian women politicians
21st-century Panamanian politicians